Pietro Bonomo (1458–1546) was an Italian humanist and diplomat, who became bishop of Trieste in 1502 and archbishop of Vienna briefly in 1522.

He was born into an important family in Trieste, and studied at the University of Bologna. He was taken into imperial service by Emperor Frederick III. He was sent to negotiate with Ludovico Sforza.

He was chancellor of Austria from 1521 to 1523.

References 
 Peter G. Bietenholz, Thomas Brian Deutscher (1987), Contemporaries of Erasmus: A Biographical Register of the Renaissance and Reformation, p. 169.

Notes 

1458 births
1546 deaths
Bishops in Friuli-Venezia Giulia
Italian Renaissance humanists
16th-century Roman Catholic bishops in Austria
Religious leaders from Trieste
Archbishops of Vienna
University of Bologna alumni